Omer and the Starchild is a French animated adventure television series created by Frédéric Koskas, Richard Bessis and Bernard Deyriès. Twenty-six episodes of twenty-six minutes were broadcast from 8 January 1992 on Canal+, and rebroadcast in 1993 on TF1. It has also aired on Cartoon Network in the United Kingdom.

Synopsis 
Omer is a small worm that lives on Earth with his friend Hoot, cook and philosopher owl. The Earth is in the grip of evil and the hope still lives in the prophecy that foretells the coming of a savior, the "Son of the Star". One day, a diamond comes down from heaven and enlightens Omer. The latter becomes glowworm and acquires the power to fly. At the same time appears the diamond, Dan, one that the prophecy says he is the son of the star. At first Dan is very awkward, he does not know much about life; both animals are then responsible for their education and realize very quickly of its major powers. With the help of Aum (the blind and wise old monkey head) and Stella (starfish), they try to save Syrena (Mermaid) and destroy the evil power embodied by the terrible Morkhan the cruel and Veranda "Tarches 7" (monsters representatives of stupidity): I I (Bigego) the vain, the polluter Virus, Bobard the liar, the coward Jitters, Mok scoffer, Melo and the pessimist the lazy Ronflette .

Episodes

Characters

Voice cast 
 Séverine Denis: Omer
 Luq Hamet Dan
 Roger Lumont: Hoot
 Henri Labussière: Aum
 Stéphanie Murat: Stella
 Serge Blumenthal: Morkhan
 Marion Game: Veranda
 Gérard Surugue, Raoul Guillet: Various Tarches

Production credits 
Opening credits
 Omer Production presente
 A series by: Frederic Koskas & Richard Bessis
 Adaptation: Frederic Koskas, Bernard Deyries
 Music: Fredic Khiat, Marc Bodossian, Christian Poulet, Satch, Gerard Presgurvic
 Scenario: Oliver Massart, Gilles Taurand
 THEME SONG
 Lyrics: Ziv Sidi
 Music: Avner Hoderov, Ziv Sidi
 Original Idea: Frederic Koskas
 Executive Producer: Typhoon Productions
 Technical Coordinators: Pascale Moreaux, Jean Cubaud
 Associate Producers: Jerome Mangin, Group Fauba France, Valorigest, Typhoon Production
 © Omer Production
Closing credits
 Decoration: Claude Lambert, Josette Mimran
 Decoration Assistants: Marie Anne Rober, Pascale Colas, Sebastien Collot, Cedric Hansen, Sophie Janan, Frederic Derome
 Theme Song
 Lyrics: Ziv Sidi
 Music: Avner Hoderov, Ziv Sidi
 Singers: Jasmine Gamliel, Momi Levi, Avner Hoderov
 Story Board: Jean Jacques Lonni, Oliver Poirette, Jean Cristophe Ville, Renzo Mezaluna
 Animation: Artplus, Island Animation (both uncredited)
 Choreography: Pol Charoy
 Production Director: Jacques Pepiot
 Music: Fredic Khiat, Marc Bodossian, Christian Poulet, Satch, Gerard Presgurvic
 Post Production: Media Dub International
 Dubbing Production: Zound Studios Ltd.
 Dubbing Director: Johanan Herson
 Voices: Jonathan Hava, Dor Zweigenbom, Jodi Rob Schenck, Howard Rypp, Susan Moser, Linda Luvitch, Johanan Herson, Adi Fox, Giora Kenet, Eva Hadad
 Recording Engineer: Lior Ben-Shachar
 Production Managers: Joe Levin, Chen Sidi
 Production Assistant: Yael Yomtov
 Sound Supervisor: Ziv Sidi
 Production Supervisor: Sharone Melamed Elkana
 ALL DUBBING AND THEME SONG PRODUCTIONS WERE DIGITALLY RECORDED AND MIXED AT: ZOUND STUDIOS LTD.
 © ALL RIGHTS RESERVED 1994
 Associate Producers: Jerome Mangin, Group Fauba France, Valorigest, Typhoon Production
 Special Assistance by: The National Film Center
 With The Participation Of: Canal+ and TF1
 © Omer Production

In other languages 
 Afrikaans: Kind van die Sterre
 Polish: Omer
 Russian: 
 Ukrainian: 
 Hebrew: עומר

External links

1992 French television series debuts
1990s French animated television series
Canal+ original programming
French children's animated adventure television series
Mermaids in television
Television series about shapeshifting